El Cortezo may refer to:
El Cortezo, Coclé
El Cortezo, Los Santos